Edward Parnell may refer to:

 Edward Parnell (politician) (1859–1922), mayor of Winnipeg, Canada
 Edward Parnell (sport shooter) (1875–1941), British Olympic sport shooter